Reza Abedini (born ) is an Iranian male volleyball player. He is part of the Iran men's national volleyball team. On club level he plays for Vezarat Defa.

References

External links
 profile at FIVB.org

1991 births
Living people
Iranian men's volleyball players
Place of birth missing (living people)